Victor Collin Matthews, Baron Matthews (5 December 1919 – 5 December 1995) was Group Managing Director of Trafalgar House, one of the United Kingdom's largest contracting businesses as well as the proprietor of the Daily Express.

Career
Born in Islington and educated at Highbury School, Victor Matthews initially worked as an office boy for a tobacco business. During World War II he served as an able seaman in the Royal Navy Volunteer Reserve and saw action at Dunkirk.

After the War he joined Trollope & Colls, a large construction business, where he became a contracts manager. He then bought his own construction business, Bridge Walker, which he expanded significantly before selling it to Trafalgar House. He became Group Managing Director of Trafalgar House in 1968 and Deputy Chairman in 1973.

In 1977 Trafalgar House acquired Beaverbrook Newspapers and in 1982, it was floated on the London Stock Exchange as Fleet Holdings with Matthews as its chairman. Matthews renamed the business Express Newspapers after its lead publication, the Daily Express. He had confrontations with the trade unions but eventually secured their support.

In August 1980 Trafalgar House bought Firestone tyre factory, a unique example of Art Deco architecture, which was about to become a listed building. Matthews personally ordered destruction of the main features of the facade over the bank holiday weekend, two days before the building was to be listed.

He was created a Life Peer on 22 July 1980 taking the title Baron Matthews, of Southgate in the London Borough of Enfield.

In 1985 the business was acquired by United Newspapers and Matthews retired to Jersey. He died there in 1995.

Family
In 1942 he married Joyce Geraldine Pilbeam; the couple had one son.

Arms

References

1919 births
1995 deaths
20th-century British businesspeople
Royal Naval Volunteer Reserve personnel of World War II
Royal Navy sailors
Life peers created by Elizabeth II